In graph theory, a vertex cover in a hypergraph is a set of vertices, such that every hyperedge of the hypergraph contains at least one vertex of that set. It is an extension of the notion of vertex cover in a graph.

An equivalent term is a hitting set: given a collection of sets, a set which intersects all sets in the collection in at least one element is called a hitting set. The equivalence can be seen by mapping the sets in the collection onto hyperedges.

Another equivalent term, used more in a combinatorial context, is transversal. 

The notions of hitting set and set cover are equivalent too.

Definition 
Each hyperedge may contain one or more vertices. 

For example, if  is this 3-uniform hypergraph:
 
then  has admits several vertex-covers of size 2, for example:
 

Note that we get back the case of vertex covers for simple graphs if the maximum size of the hyperedges is 2.

Algorithms 
The computational problems minimum hitting set and hitting set are defined as in the case of graphs.

For the hitting set problem, different parametrizations make sense. The hitting set problem is -complete for the parameter , that is, it is unlikely that there is an algorithm that runs in time  where  is the cardinality of the smallest hitting set. The hitting set problem is fixed-parameter tractable for the parameter , where  is the size of the largest edge of the hypergraph. More specifically, there is an algorithm for hitting set that runs in time .

Hitting set and set cover 
The hitting set problem is equivalent to the set cover problem: An instance of set cover can be viewed as an arbitrary bipartite graph, with sets represented by vertices on the left, elements of the universe represented by vertices on the right, and edges representing the inclusion of elements in sets. The task is then to find a minimum cardinality subset of left-vertices which covers all of the right-vertices. In the hitting set problem, the objective is to cover the left-vertices using a minimum subset of the right vertices. Converting from one problem to the other is therefore achieved by interchanging the two sets of vertices.

Applications 
An example of a practical application involving the hitting set problem arises in efficient dynamic detection of race condition. In this case, each time global memory is written, the current thread and set of locks held by that thread are stored. Under lockset-based detection, if later another thread writes to that location and there is not a race, it must be because it holds at least one lock in common with each of the previous writes. Thus the size of the hitting set represents the minimum lock set size to be race-free. This is useful in eliminating redundant write events, since large lock sets are considered unlikely in practice.

Fractional vertex cover 
A vertex cover is a special case of a fractional vertex cover in which all weights are either 0 or 1. The size of a fractional vertex-cover is the sum of fractions of all vertices.

Since a vertex-cover is a special case of a fractional vertex-cover, for every hypergraph :fractional-vertex-cover-number()  ≤   vertex-cover-number;In symbols: The fractional-vertex-cover-number of a hypergraph is, in general, smaller than its vertex-cover-number. A theorem of László Lovász provides an upper bound on the ratio between them:

 If each vertex is contained in at most  hyperedges (i.e., the degree of the hypergraph is at most ), then

Transversals in finite projective planes 
A finite projective plane is a hypergraph in which every two hyperedges intersect. Every finite projective plane is -uniform for some integer . Denote by  the -uniform projective plane. The following projective planes are known to exist:

 : it is simply a triangle graph.
 : it is the Fano plane.
  exists whenever  is the power of a prime number.

When  exists, it has the following properties:

 It has  vertices and  hyperedges.
 It is -uniform - each hyperedge contains exactly  vertices.
 It is -regular - each vertex is contained in exactly  hyperedges.
The only transversals of size  are the hyperedges; all other transversals have size at least .
.
:  every matching in  contains at most a single hyperedge.

Minimal transversals 

Computing the transversal hypergraph has applications in combinatorial optimization, in game theory, and in several fields of computer science such as machine learning, indexing of databases, the satisfiability problem, data mining, and computer program optimization.

See also 

Matching in hypergraphs – discusses also the duality between vertex-cover and matching.

References 

Graph theory
Hypergraphs